Wahed Wafa (Persian: واحد وفا) (also spelled as Wahid Wafa; born October 2, 1952) is a Tajik singer from Afghanistan. He is one of the veteran singers of 1970s era singers that are now continuing their career in exile. He currently lives in Murrieta, California, U.S.

He was also a close colleague and friend of the late Ahmad Zahir.

References 
 His Life is Music: Afghanistan’s Talented Singer.

Discography 
(Not a comprehensive list, albums released prior to 1980 are not included)
 1992: Pari Gul
 1996?: Goli Jan
 2004: Omr-e-Man

1952 births
Living people
Tajik musicians
Tajik-language singers
Afghan Tajik people
People from Murrieta, California